ORF III (ORF drei), sometimes called ORF 3 is an Austrian television channel owned by the Austrian national broadcaster, Österreichischer Rundfunk (ORF). The channel launched on 26 October 2011 at 14:00 CEST, and replaced TW1.

ORF III took over the frequencies on satellite and cable from TW1, which specialised in tourism and weather. ORF III also launched on digital terrestrial television in Austria. ORF III is currently not available to view via the Internet, however, podcasts from ORF III will be available online. ORF Sport +, the station that shared the frequency with TW1, moved to a new 24-hour slot.

Logos

References

External links

Television stations in Austria
Television channels and stations established in 2011
2011 establishments in Austria
ORF (broadcaster)